Aniwaka Haumaha ( Roberts) (born 22 April 1989) is a field hockey player from New Zealand, who plays as a midfielder.

Personal life
Aniwaka Roberts was born and raised in Wellington, New Zealand.

Roberts is the younger sister of Niniwa Roberts-Lang. Her sister was also a representative for New Zealand in field hockey.

Career

Domestic competitions

Ford NHL
In the Ford National Hockey League (NHL), Roberts represented her home region of Wellington as a member of the Capital hockey team. In her ten-year career for the team, Roberts amassed a record 101 appearances.

Premier Hockey League
Following the overhaul of the Ford NHL, Roberts became a member of the Central Falcons in the Premier Hockey League.

National team
Aniwaka Roberts made her debut for the Black Sticks in 2012, during a test series against India in Wellington.

Following her debut, she made a string of appearances in the national team before officially being named in the squad. In 2013 however, Roberts suffered a mystery medical condition which impaired her ability to represent the national team. Following a diagnosis of an allergy to shellfish, Roberts returned to her top form and back to the national squad.

2014 and 2015 proved to be Roberts' biggest years in the national team, representing the side at many major tournaments. Her last appearance for the Black Sticks was at the 2014–15 FIH World League Semi-Finals in Antwerp.

References

External links
 
 

1989 births
Living people
Female field hockey midfielders
Field hockey players at the 2022 Commonwealth Games
New Zealand female field hockey players
20th-century New Zealand women
21st-century New Zealand women